Clay Township is a township in Harrison County, in the U.S. state of Missouri.

Clay Township was founded in 1842, taking its name from Henry Clay of Kentucky.

References

Townships in Missouri
Townships in Harrison County, Missouri